Bärenstein is a municipality in the district of Erzgebirgskreis, in Saxony, Germany.

History 
From 1952 to 1990, Bärenstein was part of the Bezirk Karl-Marx-Stadt of East Germany.

References 

Erzgebirgskreis